Billboard published its first popular albums chart, at the time known as Best-Selling Popular Record Albums, in 1945. The chart was first published in the magazine dated March 24 and included ten positions, "based on reports received from more than 200 dealers" throughout the United States. In the 40 weeks that followed, eight albums by five different artists reached the top.

The first number-one album on the chart was the King Cole Trio's self-titled debut released by Capitol. It topped the charts for three weeks until it was replaced by the soundtrack of Song of Norway, an operetta, written by Robert Wright and George Forrest. The soundtrack reached number one for one more week in May. Glenn Miller, a compilation album recorded by Glenn Miller and His Orchestra released posthumously by Victor, topped the charts for two weeks in May and later in summer for an additional six weeks. The album was certified gold 23 years after its release by the Recording Industry Association of America (RIAA) for shipments of 500,000 or more units.

The second album credited to an original cast to top the chart was Carousel, released by Decca. The musical was composed by Rodgers and Hammerstein and was atop for six consecutive weeks in August and September. Bing Crosby was the only artist to have two albums atop the chart: Selections from Going My Way for six weeks and Merry Christmas for four weeks. The latter album was certified gold by the RIAA in November 1970. King Cole Trio was the longest reigning album of the year with 12 weeks at number one, followed by Glenn Miller with seven weeks. Albums released by Decca topped the charts for a total of 18 weeks, followed by Capitol at 17 weeks and Victor for 9 weeks.

Chart history

See also
1945 in music
List of Billboard 200 number-one albums

Notes

References

1945
United States albums
1945 in American music